The first day of school is the first day of an academic year. This is usually in August or September in the Northern Hemisphere and often February or March in the Southern Hemisphere, but differs from country to country.

Asia and Africa

Egypt
In Egypt, the academic year usually starts in the late third of September (particularly on the first Saturday of the last ten days of September). For example, in 2019, school started on Saturday, September 21, and in 2018, it started on Saturday, September 22. These dates are issued by the Ministry of Education (Egypt) and the Ministry of Higher Education (Egypt) and are applicable to almost all of the local schools and universities. However, private institutions may put their own starting date. The academic year for public schools and national schools consists of two semesters, each of which lasts around 15 weeks and may vary depending on the grade or subjects studied in college. However, it may change depending on the educational system that the school is run according to.

Morocco
In Morocco, the academic year commences in September and ends in June/early July 
Semester 1 (Fall): From September – January 
Semester 2 (Spring): From February – June/early July.

Tunisia
In Tunisia, the academic year commences on September 15 (or the 16th if September 15 falls on a Sunday or religious holiday) and ends on 25 May for middle and high schools, and on June 1 for primary school. Summer is approximately 3 months long.

Sierra Leone
In Sierra Leone, the academic year starts in September and ends in July the following year.

South Africa
In South Africa, the academic year starts in mid-January and ends early in December the same year.

Saudi Arabia
The first day of school is usually in late August

India
In India the schools re-open in June after the summer holidays. This applies to the whole of K-12 including elementary, secondary, and higher secondary schools. State board schools hold their annual exams in the month of March or April and new academic year starts in June after the summer holidays. However, this isn't the beginning of the new academic year for some boards like ICSE and CBSE. Their annual examinations are held in the month of February after which the new academic session begins in the last week of March. It continues until the second week of May when the summer holidays begin. This summer holiday extends until June.

Indonesia
In Indonesia, the first day of school is usually in mid-July.

Iran
In Iran, the first day of school is in late September, which is the first day of Mehr (Seventh Solar Hijri month). The schools end in late June, the last day of Khordad (Fourth Solar Hijri month).

Israel

The first day of school in Israel is September 1, or September 2 if September 1 falls on Shabbath (Saturday). The last day of school is June 30 for elementary school and June 20 for secondary and high school.

Japan
The first day of school in Japan (for all schools) falls on either April 7 or 8. School usually ends on March 24, giving the students a one week break between the years. School starts in April because the National government in the Meiji era defined their financial year from April to March from 1886, forcing all the schools to align to their financial year. Since then, the time sakura, or cherry blossoms, start to bloom became the season of meeting and farewell for the Japanese. Before that, from the 7th century to 1872, the Japanese authority defined their financial year from January to December. From 1872 to 1886, the financial year was changed three times.

Jordan 

In Jordan, the first day of school is on September 1 for most of the schools. Each school year consists of two semester, with a winter break (short holiday) and a summer break (long holiday), though the beginning and ending of each semester is not the same each year.

Korea

In Korea, the school year begins on March 1, but the first day of school in Korea is on March 2, as March 1 is a national holiday. The last day of school is in early January or February. It was common for students to end their second semester in late December, take a month off for winter vacation, come back to school for few weeks and then take a few weeks off for spring vacation before March. However, this has changed a lot recently and many schools are choosing to extend their second semester until early January before taking a longer break until the start of the school year in March.

Malaysia

The school year for primary and secondary schools in Malaysia starts in early March (used to be January before 2021) and ends in late-January the following year (used to be late-November before 2021), prior to the national exams. Some states that have their weekends on Friday and Saturday instead of Sunday will start and end the school year a day earlier or later (depending on the year) as compared to the other states. The school terms are divided into 4 terms, the 1st and 3rd term ends with a 1 week break while the 2nd term, also known as the mid-year term, ends with a 2 week mid-year break. The last term ends with a long break that last just about over a month (about 40 days). The national exams (Sijil Pelajaran Malaysia) are also held in February during the long break. National holidays are observed by all schools throughout the nation while state public holidays are only observed by schools within the states. Schools, at their own discretion, also usually give week long breaks for festival holidays like the Lunar New Year or Hari Raya Aidilfitri as students and teachers will be returning to their hometowns with their families.

Pakistan
In Pakistan, the Government and Private schools hold their annual examinations in February–March Period. After Annual examinations, The First Day of New academic year of Students is between end of March or early April. Boards in Pakistan like BISE also start their first Day of academic year of Students in between March and April. Academic year of Students consist of summer vacations which are started on end of May or early June till 14th August (Independence Day of Pakistan). Academic Year of Students also consists of Winter Vacations which are started on end of December till first week of January.

The First Day of School

School usually starts on the 1st week of April. But due to the pandemic this 2022, it started around the 2nd week of August. Because of the pandemic, schools switched to online classes. The problem was not all families could afford electronics for their children's education. So eventually,face-to-face classes were resumed.

Qatar
The first day of school in Qatar is on September 15.

Singapore
The school year for all Singapore primary and secondary schools starts from early January and ends sometimes in late November. This takes into account 40 weeks of curriculum time for teaching and learning before the start of the national examinations, and six weeks of school vacation at end of the year for teachers and students.

Vietnam

The first day of school in Vietnam is September 5. However, nowadays students begin going to school in early or mid-August.

Caribbean

Trinidad and Tobago 

In Trinidad and Tobago the academic year is decided by the Ministry of Education. The year begins in the first or second week of September and generally ends the last week of June. Public schools usually open on Monday and private schools begin on the Tuesday or Wednesday.
There are three semesters which are separated by Christmas break (mid December to early January - two weeks) and Easter break (mid April to early May - two weeks). Schools usually close in the last week of June for two months for July/August holiday.

Central America

Costa Rica
The first day of school in Costa Rica is in February and the academic year ends in December. The Education Ministry changes the date every year to ensure 200 effective days are in the school calendar.

Europe

Armenia
The first day of school in Armenia is on September 1. It is the national day of knowledge and is considered the start of the first semester not only for schools, but also for all educational institutions. The second semester usually ends in the end of May.

Azerbaijan
The first day of school in Azerbaijan is on September 15 or the first following Monday if September 15 falls on Weekends. The last day of the school year is June 14.

Belgium
The first day of school in Belgium is on September 1 or the first following Monday if September 1 falls on Saturday or Sunday.

Bulgaria
The first day of school in Bulgaria is on 15 of September. The school year ends in May or June.

Croatia
The school year in Croatia doesn't have a fixed date, but it usually starts in the first half of September. It ends in the middle of June. Until 2019, school year started on the first Monday of September.

Estonia
The first day of school in Estonia is September 1.

France
The school year in France doesn't have a fixed date, but it starts at the beginning of September, in the first 2 weeks. However, in Metropolitan France it is on September 1 or the first following Monday if September 1 falls on Saturday or Sunday. It ends at the beginning of July, leaving approximately 2 months of summer break.

Greece
The first day of school in Greece is September 11, or the first Monday following if September 11 is a Saturday or Sunday.

Hungary
The first day of school in Hungary is September 1.

Ireland
The first day of school in Ireland can be as early as August 23rd or as late as September 1st, it depends on the school and region. The summer holidays begin around May 30th for Secondary schools and June 30th for Primary Schools.

Italy
In Italy the school year generally starts around mid-September. It ends in the first week of June.

Latvia
In Latvia the school year always starts on September 1, or the following Monday if September 1 happens to be a Saturday or Sunday.

Lithuania
The first day of school in Lithuania is September 1, or the first Monday following if September 1 falls on Saturday or Sunday.

Moldova
In Moldova the first day of school is on September 1.

Netherlands
The first day of school in the Netherlands depends on the location. The country is divided in 3 zones: north, middle and south. They have a different start and end date that rotates each year. Most of the time the start date is from the middle of August to early September.

Norway
The Norwegian school year does not have set dates, but starts in the middle of August and ends in mid June. The school year consist of 190 days and the exact dates are set by the County Governor in each county the preceding fall.

North Macedonia 
The first day of school in North Macedonia is on September 1 or the first following Monday if September 1 falls on Saturday or Sunday.

Poland
According to a 2010 decree of Polish Minister of Public Education, the first day of school for regular compulsory education schools in Poland is on September 1 or the first following Monday if September 1 falls on Friday, Saturday or Sunday. The last day is the first Friday after June 20.

Portugal
In Portugal the school starts at the beginning of September, in the first week. In 2019 the school starts between September 10–13.

Romania
Schools in Romania start on a day decided by the ministry of education. Most school years tend to start on Sep 15 or Sep 16 and end on the third week of June. Occasionally, school starts on the 9 or 10 of September.

Russia
Schools in Russia (and formerly the Soviet Union) historically begin on September 1. This exact date for the country was fixed by the Decree of the Council of the People's Commissars in 1935 and was established officially by the Decree of the Supreme Soviet of the Soviet Union No. 3018-X in 1980. In 1984, September 1 was officially declared to be the Knowledge Day. Nowadays, if it falls on a Saturday or Sunday, most schools opt to begin actual lessons the following Monday. Traditionally, students have celebratory assembly and gift flower bouquets to teachers.

Slovakia
The first day of school in Slovakia is September 2, or the first Monday following if September 2 falls on Friday, Saturday or Sunday. September 1 is public holiday in Slovakia (Constitution Day).

Slovenia
The first day of school in Slovenia is September 1, or the first following working day if September 1 falls on Saturday or Sunday. The school year ends on June 24 (June 25 is national holiday).

Ukraine
In Ukraine the school year always starts on September 1, or the following Monday if September 1 happens to be a Saturday or Sunday.

United Kingdom

England, Wales & Northern Ireland
The first day of school for state schools in England and Wales varies by local authority and sometimes by school, but it is nearly always during the first week of September, or occasionally in the second week.

Scotland
The school term in Scotland begins in mid- to late-August, more than a week earlier than in the rest of the UK. The precise date varies by local authority and sometimes by school.

North America

Canada
In the nineteenth and early twentieth centuries, school years were highly irregular, especially in rural one-room schools and would vary from school to school.  While the ideal was a September start, schools were often closed for weeks or months at a time due to lack of teachers, and with many school boards deliberately closing their schools during harvest (September) and the coldest weeks of the year (January) or for local or ethnic holidays that weren't recognized by the provincial authorities (for example Julian calendar Christmas and Easter in Ukrainian Canadian settlements).  In all of those cases the school year had to start in the summer to make the mandatory number of hours. Standardization of the school year in most provinces was mostly completed by the end of the 1920s and since then most locations in Canada has had the first day of school as the Tuesday in September after Labour Day. However, some schools start in August so that their mid-point of the year will coincide with Christmas break.

United States
In the United States, educational policy is determined primarily at the state level and at the level of individual school districts. Therefore, there is no one particular day on which all schools start. During much of the 20th century, it was common for schools to start shortly after Labor Day (September), and in some areas of the United States, this is still the norm. However, it has become increasingly common for schools to start earlier in August or even late July. For example, in the San Diego Unified School District, schools start on the last Monday of August. New York City Department of Education begins the school year the week after the Labor Day holiday.

Conflicting pressures affect the first day of school.  For example, since the school year is normally divided into two semesters, many teachers want one semester to finish in December just before the winter holidays, and the second semester to start when classes resume in January.  This requires starting the school year in mid-August.  Employers who rely on teenagers to work summer jobs want the school year to start in the first or second week of September, when the main tourist season has ended.  Because of the role of an amusement park Kings Dominion in promoting a law requiring September start dates in Virginia for almost four decades, the law was called the King Dominion law.  When school buildings do not have air conditioning, then starting school during the hottest month of the year can lead to schools closing earlier at the start of the day, for health and safety reasons.

Oceania

Australia
In Australia the first day of school is around February 1, dependent on individual state/territory (and schoolmarm or private school system).

New Zealand
In New Zealand, the first day of school is generally during the last week in January, or the first week in February.

Papua New Guinea
In Papua New Guinea, the first day of school is around the third week in January.

South America

Brazil 

In Brazil the first day of school is on the first Thursday of February, to take 200 school days. The year usually ends in late November or early December. In 2022, for example, first day of school was on February 7 and last will be on December 19. First semester or autumn academic term lasted from Monday, February 7, 2022 to Friday, July 15, 2022, while second semester or spring term are currently lasting from Monday, August 1, 2022 to Monday, December 19, 2022.

Argentina 
In Argentina school usually starts first days of March, and ends in the second week of December. Secondary schools start a few days after primary schools and end at the end of November.

References

Schools